Stefano Onorato Ferretti (Genoa, 1640Genoa, 19 August 1720) was the 138th Doge of the Republic of Genoa and king of Corsica.

Biography 
Closer to a "conservationist" republican policy, as opposed to a vision of a more modern Genoese state and open to future scenarios, Stefano Onorato Ferretti managed to win a significant majority of votes in the customs elections of 22 August 1705; as doge he was also invested with the related biennial office of king of Corsica. The mandate, the ninety-third in biennial succession and the one hundred and thirty-eighth in republican history, ended on 22 August 1707. Among the important events during his dogate was the passage and reception in Genoa of Duke Victor Amadeus II of Savoy.

See also 
 Doge of Genoa
 Republic of Genoa

References 

18th-century Doges of Genoa
1640 births
1720 deaths